Rey is a given name. Notable people with the name include:

Domingo Rey d'Harcourt, Spanish military officer
Rey Bucanero, the ring name of wrestler Arturo García Ortiz
Rey Galang, Filipino martial artist
Rey Maualuga, American college football player
Rey Mysterio Jr., the ring name of wrestler Oscar Gutierrez
Rey Misterio, the ring name of wrestler Miguel Ángel López Díaz
Rey Pagtakhan, Canadian parliamentarian
Rey Quiñones, Puerto Rican baseball player
Rey Ruiz, Cuban singer
Rey Sánchez, Puerto Rican baseball player
Rey Valera, Filipino musician
Rej Volpato, Italian footballer
Rey Washam, American drummer
Jonathan Rey Bornstein, American-Israeli soccer player

Fictional characters named Rey
Rey (Star Wars), a character in the Star Wars films
Rey Yan (Chronicles of the Cursed Sword), anime character
Rey Za Burrel, Gundam anime character
Rey Curtis, Law & Order detective, played by Benjamin Bratt

See also
Rey (disambiguation)
Rey (surname)
Rei (name)